The 1983 Virginia Slims of Los Angeles was a women's tennis tournament played on outdoor hard courts at the Manhattan Country Club in Manhattan Beach, California in the United States that was part of the 1983 Virginia Slims World Championship Series. The tournament was held from August 8 through August 14, 1983. First-seeded Martina Navratilova won the singles title and earned $27,5000 first-prize money.

Finals

Singles
 Martina Navratilova defeated  Chris Evert-Lloyd 6–1, 6–3
 It was Navratilova's 10th singles title of the year and the 80th of her career.

Doubles
 Martina Navratilova /  Pam Shriver defeated  Betsy Nagelsen /  Virginia Ruzici 6–1 6–0
It was Shriver's 10th title of the year and the 44th of her career.

Prize money

See also
 Evert–Navratilova rivalry

References

External links
 ITF tournament edition details
 Tournament draws

Los Angeles
1983
1983 in sports in California
1983 in American tennis
1983 in Los Angeles
August 1983 sports events in the United States